Julia Jakob, formerly Julia Gross  (born 15 April 1991) is a Swiss orienteer. She was born in Richterswil and resides in Zürich.

She won a bronze medal in the sprint at the 2014 European Orienteering Championships in Palmela. At the 2017 World Orienteering Championships in Tartu, Estonia, she placed 15th in the long distance, 15th in the sprint final, and fourth in the relay with the Swiss team.

She won a gold medal in the relay at the 2018 World Orienteering Championships in Latvia, together with Elena Roos and Judith Wyder. She also won the Venla Relay in 2018 together with Tove Alexandersson, Anna Mårsell and Magdalena Olsson.

References

External links

1991 births
Living people
Swiss orienteers
Foot orienteers
People from Richterswil
Sportspeople from the canton of Zürich
Junior World Orienteering Championships medalists